The Deutsche Reichsbahn Class 01.10 was a series of  express steam locomotives. Developed at the end of the 1930s it was part of the standard locomotive programme (Einheitsdampflokomotiven). Modernized in the 1950s, the class lasted almost until the end of steam operation at the West German Deutsche Bundesbahn (DB).

History 
With the introduction of high  speed services on an increasing number of lines Deutsche Reichsbahn required powerful express steam locomotives. They should be capable of a top speed of 150 km/h and of hauling trains of 500 tonnes at 120 km/h, as well as trains of 350 tonnes at 100 km/h up a 5 ‰ inclines. This was more than the existing Class 01 and 03 two-cylinder engines could cope with, having no sufficient power reserves and rough riding qualities at higher speed, Hence the 01.10 was designed with a three-cylinder layout. Furthermore, they were equipped with a streamlined casing to reduce air resistance. Frictional losses were minimized by the use of roller bearings on the driving and coupling rods.

Out of a perceived requirement for 400 locomotives, 204 were initially ordered in 1939 from all major German locomotive manufacturers. However, as a result of the Second World War only 55 were eventually delivered, all of which came from Berliner Maschinenbau.

The Class 01.10 was delivered to the following locomotive sheds (Bahnbetriebswerke): Leipzig Hbf West, Berlin Anhalter Bahnhof, Halle, Hamburg-Altona, Hannover-Ost, Bebra, Erfurt P, Dresden-Altstadt, Frankfurt/Oder Pbf Würzburg and Munich as well as the Grunewald Locomotive Research Office. During the war, some of the locomotives were transferred to Breslau and Kattowitz .

In 1944 all engines of the class were moved to western Germany due to the course of the war.

After the Second World War the engines were in a pitiful state. Parts of  their streamlined claddings were missing and the boilers, made of steel that was not age-resistant, showed signs of fatigue. On 20 June 1945 the entire class was temporarily withdrawn, having run less than 500,000 km. However, as a result of the post-war locomotive shortage, the class was partially reprieved and several engines with minor damages were overhauled. However the majority of engines remained sidelined until 1949. In that year it was decided that all but one locomotives (the finally retired 01 1067), should be refurbished. The streamlined casings were completely removed and Witte smoke deflectors fitted. The new front view looked unusual for a German steam engine with the smokebox door being cut off in the upper third to provide space for the retained feedwater heater. Only two engines were provided with the usual circular smokebox door.

However, the problem of the boiler being made of non-durable St 47 K steel remained. Because the engines were by far too young to be written off, they received all-new welded high-performance boilers. These were built by Henschel of Kassel between 1953 and 1956 and installed at the Brunswick rmaintenance works, along with a mixing preheater system.

Additionally in 1956 engine 01 1100 received an oil-firing, enhancing its performance considerably. Oil-firing allows for a better control of the grate and could be more easily adapted to respective operating conditions. The engines were therefore more economical than coal-fired locomotives. Working conditions for firemen were also improved. Fuel oil, then available as a waste product, was used for firing. Following their positive experience with 01 1100, the DB decided in 1957 to convert another 33 locomotives of this class to oil-firing.

In 1968, as part of a renumbering scheme to conform with electronic data processing (EDP), the remaining coal-fired locomotives were given the class designation 011 while the oil-fired engines were now class 012.

The locomotives were used on all important main lines until electrification, for example on the Würzburg–Hamburg or Hamm–Hamburg routes. Towards the end they were deployed on the Hamburg–Westerland and Rheine–Norddeich lines.

On 31 May 1975, the  remaining engines from Rheine shed ran the last scheduled services, being celebrated by a large number of railway enthusiasts.

Preserved locomotives 

Thanks to their relatively recent withdrawal from service, ten of these locomotives have been preserved.

As of October 2019 four Class 01.10 engines are on display at museums:

 01 1056 is stored in the open at the Darmstadt-Kranichstein Railway Museum. It is the only surviving 01.10 engine that was never converted to oil firing.
 01 1061 is on display at the German Steam Locomotive Museum in Neuenmarkt-Wirsberg.
 01 1081 is being cosmetically restored at the South German Railway Museum.
 01 1082 is part of the railway exhibition at the German Museum of Technology.

Please note: Only the museums at Berlin and Neuenmarkt-Wirsberg are open on a daily basis (except Mondays).

The other remaining engines are:

 01 1063 is plinthed near Braunschweig main station. Until the 1970s Braunschweig was the location of vast railway maintenance works, responsible for the 01.10 class.
 01 1066 of the Ulm Railway Friends. It saw about 20 years of mainline heritage service but was withdrawn in 2016 for a major overhaul.
 01 1075 is operational and based in Rotterdam (Netherlands), belonging to the Stoom Stichting Nederland. It was re-converted to coal-firing.
 01 1100 belongs to the Deutsche Bahn AG. It was restored to working order for the 1985 anniversary of German railways but is currently stored "out of ticket" at Koblenz.
 01 1102 is privately owned. In 1995 it was restored to operational condition at Meiningen Steam Locomotive Works. This  included the recreation of the 1930s streamlined casing and a fictitious steel blue livery. It is out of service since 2004.
01 1104 was acquired by Steamtown Carnforth (UK) in 1975 and stored there until 1996. Subsequently, repatriated to Germany, it is likely to steam again in 2020.

See also 
 Deutsche Reichsbahn
 List of DRG locomotives and railbuses

References

External links 
 Grand Express Europe (DR Stromliniendampflok / Streamlinerlocomotiv DR 011102)

01.10
4-6-2 locomotives
01.10
Railway locomotives introduced in 1939
Streamlined steam locomotives
Berliner locomotives
Standard gauge locomotives of Germany
2′C1′ h3 locomotives
Passenger locomotives